Russell Glyn Ballard (born 31 October 1945) is an English singer, songwriter and musician.

Originally coming to prominence as the lead singer and guitarist for the band Argent, Ballard became a songwriter and producer by the late 1970s. His compositions "New York Groove", "You Can Do Magic", "Since You Been Gone", "I Surrender", "Liar", "Winning", "I Know There's Something Going On", "Can't Shake Loose", "So You Win Again" and "God Gave Rock and Roll to You" were hits for other artists during the 1970s and 1980s.  He also scored several minor hits under his own name in the early and mid-1980s.

Early life
Ballard was born in Waltham Cross, Hertfordshire, England.

Career
Ballard was initially a guitarist, joining Buster Meikle & The Day Breakers in 1961 together with his older brother Roy and their friend the drummer Bob Henrit. After a stint with The Roulettes, backing Adam Faith, he then went on to join Unit 4 + 2 in 1967, before becoming the lead singer and guitarist of Argent (along with Henrit, who joined as drummer), writing their hit "God Gave Rock and Roll to You", which would later be covered by both Petra and KISS.  Ballard is most well known as the vocalist on Argent's smash "Hold Your Head Up".  In 1972, Ballard performed on Colin Blunstone's album Ennismore, which was produced by Chris White. Ballard also wrote the hit single "I Don't Believe in Miracles", which featured on that album.

Songwriting
He left Argent in 1974 and pursued a solo and songwriting career. He wrote such hits as Three Dog Night's "Liar" (originally recorded by Argent), Hot Chocolate's 1977 UK chart topper "So You Win Again", and Rainbow's 1979 hit "Since You Been Gone". Head East had also recorded the song in 1978 for its self-titled album, and before that it was included in Ballard's 1976 solo album Winning. Ballard also wrote Rainbow's 1981 No. 3 (UK) hit "I Surrender".

Ballard also wrote and performed on Roger Daltrey's first two solo albums, Daltrey (1973) and Ride a Rock Horse (1975). Daltrey recorded some other Russ Ballard originals for his McVicar soundtrack, and his albums Under a Raging Moon and Can't Wait to See the Movie. Ballard undertook a tour with Roger Daltrey in 1985, playing guitar and singing one of his own songs.

British pop band Hello recorded Ballard's "New York Groove" in 1975, reaching No. 7 in Germany and No. 9 in the UK.
"New York Groove" would also be recorded three years later by Ace Frehley, who turned the tune into a stateside hit.

Ballard also wrote the No. 17, 1981 hit for Santana, called "Winning", which appeared on their album entitled Zebop! and had previously been released by Ballard himself on his second solo album.  To promote the Winning album he toured Europe and the US in October and November 1976, working with the John Stanley Media Management Company and a four-piece band, performing at large theatre venues in Europe and medium-sized clubs such as The Bottom Line in New York and the Whisky a Go Go in Los Angeles.

Ballard wrote and produced "You Can Do Magic" for the group America on its 1982 album View from the Ground. The single climbed to No. 8 on the Billboard Hot 100 in October 1982, and helped resurrect the band's career. The following year, America brought in Ballard to produce their follow-up album, Your Move. One of its tracks, "The Border", which was co-written by Ballard with Dewey Bunnell, reached No. 33 on the Billboard Hot 100.

Ballard wrote ABBA singer Anni-Frid Lyngstad's 1982 solo hit: "I Know There's Something Going On" (which was produced by Phil Collins, and also featured Collins on drums). The track reached No. 13 on the Billboard Hot 100. He also penned "Can't Shake Loose" for fellow ABBA former member Agnetha Fältskog, which peaked at No. 29 in the same listings.

Returning to a harder rock vein, Ballard wrote "I Did It For Love," which became the last Billboard Hot 100 hit for Night Ranger, appearing on their 1988 Man in Motion album.  In 1991 the song he co-wrote with John Waite and Jonathan Cain, "So This Is Eden", appeared on Bad English's album, Backlash.

Ballard has also written and produced for Elkie Brooks, and in 2005 acting as a talent scout, he "discovered" Lauren Harris.

Solo recordings

As a solo artist, Ballard charted once on the US Billboard Hot 100 chart, when "On the Rebound" reached No. 58 in 1980. English rock band Uriah Heep covered "On the Rebound" in 1982 on their album Abominog. In 1980, he released a solo album on Epic entitled Barnet Dogs. It reached no. 187 on the Billboard 200.

Another notable solo hit, "Voices" – from his second self-titled album (1984) – was featured in the Miami Vice episode "Calderone's Return: Part 2 – Calderone's Demise", which aired on 26 October 1984. The song was a brief hit on rock radio stations, peaking at No. 15 on the Hot Mainstream Rock Tracks chart.  However, "Voices" stalled below the Billboard Hot 100, peaking at No. 110. Another song from the same album, "In the Night" was featured in the episode "Calderone's Return: Part 1 – The Hit List". The show also featured "Your Time Is Gonna Come" by Ballard later in its run.

"The Fire Still Burns", the title track of his 1985 album matched the placement of the previous year's "Voices", peaking at No. 15 on the Hot Mainstream Rock Tracks chart.

Ballard and Kiss
In addition to Kiss covering  "God Gave Rock and Roll to You", retitled as "God Gave Rock 'n' Roll to You II":
 Kiss drummer Peter Criss recorded Ballard's "Let Me Rock You" and "Some Kinda Hurricane" on his 1982 Let Me Rock You album.
 Kiss guitarist Ace Frehley covered "New York Groove" on his self-titled solo album in 1978. Frehley's version reached No. 13 on the Billboard Hot 100 chart and has been a regular staple of Kiss live performances, during tours in which Frehley has taken part.
 During his non-Kiss years, Frehley also recorded a cover of the Ballard song "Into the Night", for his 1987 Frehley's Comet album.

Ballard songs recorded by other acts
"Can't Shake Loose", recorded by Agnetha Fältskog.
"Can't We Talk It Over", recorded by Leslie McKeown (1981/1982)
"Cuckoo" (As "Are You Cuckoo?"), recorded by Bay City Rollers.
"Dancer", recorded by Rare Earth (A Brand New World - 2008)
"Dream On", recorded by King Kobra (Thrill of a Lifetime - 1986).
"Feels Like the Real Thing", recorded by Stormbringer (Stormbringer - 1983).
"First Heartbreak", recorded by Ian Lloyd (Love Stealer - 1979).
"Free Me", recorded by Roger Daltrey (Soundtrack album of McVicar – 1980).
"God Gave Rock 'n' Roll to You", recorded by Argent, Petra, and Kiss.
"Heartbreaker", recorded by Olivia Newton-John (‘’Let Me Be There (Non-American Pressing)’’ - 1973).
"Hearts of Fire", recorded by Roger Daltrey (on his album Can't Wait to See the Movie).
"I Did It For Love", recorded by Night Ranger (Man In Motion - 1988).
"I Don't Believe in Miracles", recorded by Colin Blunstone.
"I Know There's Something Going On", recorded by Frida.
"I Surrender", recorded by Head East, Rainbow, Cherie & Marie Currie, At Vance, and Stratovarius.
"I Will Be There", recorded by Gogmagog.
"I'm Confessing", recorded by Alan Longmuir (Single A-side, 1977).
"I'm the One Who Loves You", recorded by A II Z (Single A-side, 1981).
"Into the Night", recorded by Frehley's Comet. (Frehley's Comet - 1987)
"Is Anybody There", recorded by E. F. Band (Deep Cut – 1982).
"Is My Love In Vain", recorded by  Nick Simper's Fandango(Future Times - 1980).
"Jody", recorded by America.
"Juliet", recorded by Girl (Killing Time – 1997).
"Just a Dream Away", recorded by Roger Daltrey (Soundtrack album of McVicar – 1980).
"Just Another Day", recorded by Phoenix, Nick Simper's Fandango(Slipstreaming - 1979).
"Let It Rock", recorded by Hello (1977).
"Let Me Rock You", recorded by Peter Criss (Let Me Rock You - 1982).
"Liar", recorded by Argent, Three Dog Night, Graham Bonnet and Rick Medlocke & Blackfoot.
"Livin' in Suspicion", recorded by the Graham Bonnet Band (Meanwhile, Back in the Garage – 2018)
"Lost City", recorded by The Shadows (Sound of the Shadows – 1965)
"Love Is a Game", recorded by Girl and E. F. Band.
"My Time Is Gonna Come", recorded by Roger Daltrey (Soundtrack album of McVicar – 1980).
"New York Groove", recorded by Hello, Ace Frehley and Sweet.
"No More the Fool", recorded by Elkie Brooks.
"Nowhere to Run", recorded by Santana
"On the Rebound", recorded by Uriah Heep (Abominog – 1982).
"Panic Attack", recorded by Bert Heerink (Better Yet – 2009).
"Prove It", recorded by Rare Earth (A Brand New World - 2008)
"Riding with the Angels", recorded by Samson, Heretic, and Bruce Dickinson.
"S.O.S.", recorded by Graham Bonnet (Line-Up - 1981).
"Since You Been Gone", recorded by Clout, Cherie & Marie Currie, Head East, Rainbow, Alcatrazz, Impellitteri, Crash Kelly, and Brian May.
"So You Win Again", recorded by Hot Chocolate and South African band Copperfield.
"Some Kinda Hurricane", recorded by Peter Criss (Let Me Rock You - 1982).
"Someday We'll Be Together", recorded by The Pointer Sisters (1981)
"Star Studded Sham", recorded by Hello (1976)
"The Mirror Lies", recorded by Graham Bonnet (My Kingdom Come double single - 2015)
"Tonight", recorded by Tokyo Blade (Tokyo Blade - 1983)
"Voices", recorded by Karen Kamon (1987)
"Winning", recorded by Nona Hendryx and later Santana.
"You Can Do Magic", recorded by America.

Solo discography

Studio albums

Live albums
Book of Love Tour Live 2007 (CD) (10 April 2020), Russell Ballard Ltd.

Singles
All songs written by Ballard.

Charting singles
"On the Rebound" (1980) - No. 58 on Billboard Hot 100
"Voices" (1984) - No. 110 on Billboard Bubbling Under Hot 100 Singles / No. 15 Top Tracks (Mainstream Rock Tracks)
"The Fire Still Burns" (1985) - No. 105 on Billboard Bubbling Under Hot 100 Singles / No. 15 Top Rock Tracks (Mainstream Rock Tracks)

Portrait
In 1984, Mary Turner produced a 15-minute portrait of Russ Ballard as a record with the title "A Portrait Of An Artist By Mary Turner".

Timeline

See also
 List of songs recorded written and produced by Russ Ballard
 List of lead vocalists

References

External links

1945 births
Living people
English rock guitarists
English rock singers
English male singer-songwriters
English songwriters
People from Waltham Cross
Argent (band) members
Epic Records artists
Musicians from Hertfordshire
English male guitarists
British male songwriters